Cordel may refer to:

 Cordel, a unit of length, see Obsolete Spanish and Portuguese units of measurement
 Cordel literature, popular and inexpensively Brazilian printed booklets or pamphlets containing folk novels, poems and songs
 Cordel Do Fogo Encantado, a popular band from Pernambuco, Brazil